Gas Pipe Clarinet is a musical  style wherein the clarinet player/s uses the instrument to produce honks, growls, squeaks and effects that sound like animal noises, laughter and so on. It is designed to be humorous and was used in many musical comedy acts from the 1910s to the 1930s. Players of this style included Fess Williams, Boyd Senter, and Ted Lewis but the best example of the style is probably George McClennon.

External links
George McClennon at redhotjazz.com

Musical techniques
Clarinets